is a role-playing video game developed by Game Arts originally for the Dreamcast console as part of their Grandia series. Initially released in Japan in August 2000 by Game Arts, the game was later made available in English for North America the following December and in Europe in February 2001, with both releases published by Ubi Soft. The game was later ported to Sony PlayStation 2, where it was released worldwide throughout 2002, and for Microsoft Windows exclusively in North America and Europe later that year. 

An enhanced port, based upon the Dreamcast version and entitled Grandia II Anniversary Edition was released on August 24, 2015, on Steam and GOG.com. A high-definition remaster of the game was released in North America and Europe on August 16, 2019, together with one of the original, for Nintendo Switch; an associated update for the Windows PC Anniversary Edition was released on October 15, 2019. GungHo Online Entertainment clarified that a Japanese release of the remasters will follow in the future.

The game was developed by many of the same staff members who worked on the original Grandia, including music composer Noriyuki Iwadare. However, it was designed around creating a more "mature" product than the previous title and the first in the series to feature fully three-dimensional graphics.

The game is set in a fantasy world thousands of years after a battle between Granas, the god of light, and Valmar, the god of darkness, nearly destroyed the planet until Valmar was split into pieces and scattered across the land. In the aftermath of the battle, the Church of Granas has led humanity to prosperity by spreading the word of good. However, when a young mercenary named Ryudo is charged to protect a songstress from the church named Elena, their journey reveals that the church's history, as well as the history of the world, is not all it seems.

While the original Dreamcast version of the game received a largely positive response from critics in Japan and the West, its later ports to the PlayStation 2 and PC were typically seen as inferior due to a combination of technical shortcomings and other high-profile games released during the transition.

Gameplay 
The turn-based battle system is based around the IP gauge. Character icons move from left to right on the gauge. Upon reaching the beginning of the action phase on the gauge, characters select an action. That action is executed when their icon reaches the end of the action phase. The system supports limited movement during a battle; an invisible barrier prevents characters from wandering outside the arena. 

Characters can run from one place to another, strike opponents, and then retreat. Selecting "critical" makes a character or enemy strike an opponent simultaneously. If the critical lands during the opponent's action phase, it will "cancel" the opponent's move and push the opponent's icon substantially backward along the IP gauge, delaying the opponent from taking action. Selecting "combo" makes a character land two hits on an enemy. The hits can be increased with certain accessories, up to four hits per combo. A combo can also "counter" if it hits an enemy in an attack pose, dealing additional damage. Suppose the combo kills the intended target before reaching the final blow. In that case, the character will attack the closest enemy to complete the combo.

Characters can use magic from equipped Mana Eggs. Using magic consumes MP. More powerful magic takes longer to cast. Special moves and spells can be learned with Skills Coins and Magic Coins and have a maximum level of 5. Spell efficiency is increased and casting time decreases as the level increases. Spells can be cast instantly if a character has skills equipped, giving a +100% bonus to the element of that particular spell. Special move sets are learned from Skill Books, then equipped onto characters. Skills can boost stats or add additional effects, such as increased item drops or a canceling effect to certain spells.

Plot 
Ryudo is a mercenary known as a Geohound. The Church of Granas hires him to escort Elena, a Songstress of Granas, to Garmia Tower for a ceremony. Upon arrival, he is asked to wait while they perform the ritual. However, he hears a scream and rushes up to the top floor. Seeing everyone dead and Elena with a pair of wings, he rescues her, and both return to Carbo Village. Back in the village, Ryudo is asked by the priest to escort Elena to St. Heim Papal State to seek Pope Zera to help cleanse Elena of the Wings of Valmar, one of several pieces of Valmar, which now possesses her. 

Before he can turn the job down, the village is attacked by a mysterious winged woman, who engages and defeats Ryudo in battle. She introduces herself as Millennia and disappears. Ryudo accepts the job and departs for St. Heim with Elena. In the town of Agear, Millennia appears again, this time more friendly, and teams up with Ryudo. She accidentally reveals herself that she is the Wings of Valmar and that she possesses Elena, sharing her body as a separate being. After Roan and the Beast Man, Mareg, join the group, they find more pieces of Valmar, which Millenia absorbs after they defeat them.

When the group arrives at St. Heim Papal State, Elena meets with Pope Zera, who wishes to speak with Ryudo. The Pope requests that he find the legendary Granasaber, a weapon wielded by Granas that was used to defeat Valmar. Ryudo reluctantly agrees, and the group travels to Roan's hometown of Cyrum. Upon arrival, the group rests at the inn as Roan departs. The following day, it is revealed that Roan is the prince and that the people of Cyrum once assisted Valmar against Granas in the ancient war. The party enters the castle, finds the Gate of Darkness open, and discovers an ancient factory underneath the castle. They encounter the Claws of Valmar and, later, Melfice back in the castle. Melfice is Ryudo's brother and the man Mareg seeks, who flees after defeating the group in battle, telling Ryudo to face him at home. Roan is crowned king and chooses to stay in Cyrum to encourage its people that the past does not predict their future. After being rescued, Tio, the being possessed by the Claws and an Automata, joins the group.

The party arrives by boat in the village of Garlan, Ryudo's hometown. Ryudo is immediately chastised for returning and commanded to leave. He reveals that Melfice has returned, and he plans to kill him to end his torment of the world. At the inn, a disguised Skye reveals Ryudo's history to Elena. Garlan used to be a village of swordsmen, with Melfice being the best. However, one night, during a storm, the idol in the hills grew restless, so the villagers sent Reena, Melfice's fiancé, to pray at the altar. She didn't return, and Melfice investigated, being secretly followed by Ryudo. In the shrine, Ryudo witnessed Melfice murder Reena. Ryudo later fled from town and stayed away for three years, causing the villagers to believe he abandoned them, hence their contempt. In the morning, the group travels up the mountain to confront Melfice. 

At its peak, they defeat Melfice, who afterward reconciles with Ryudo and informs the group of the Granasaber's location before dying. While Ryudo grieves, the Horns possess him, causing him to lose consciousness. At the inn, Elena asks Millenia for help, but she initially refuses. However, she relents and uses her powers to seal the Horns inside of Ryudo, who then awakens her with a renewed sense of purpose. But Elena questions Granas, as it was Valmar who saved Ryudo.

The group travels to Nannan, Mareg's hometown, near the location of the Granasaber. The group is then informed of the Granasaber's whereabouts: within a giant cyclone to the east. The group travels there and deactivates the artificial storm, revealing the Granasaber. However, Selene, the High Priestess, appears and sacrifices a Cathedral Knight to revive the Body of Valmar around the Granasaber; the group enters the body and destroys it. Tio reveals the Granasaber as a ship, teleporting the group inside and guiding the giant sword back to St. Heim. 

The "Day of Darkness" arrives, and the group witnesses the Cathedral Knights slaughtering townsfolk and destroying the Knights. Elena reveals her true mission: to absorb the pieces of Valmar so the Granasaber can destroy them. In the cathedral, Selene transforms into the Heart of Valmar, and the group destroys it. They catch up to Zera, who reveals that Valmar was victorious in the battle against Granas, who was killed. He tells Elena that he wants to use her to bring Valmar back to life, and then he takes her to the Moon of Valmar.

The group uses the Granasaber to reach the moon and save Elena. A wounded Mareg later sacrifices himself to allow the group to escape from the moon. Crashing near Cyrum, now besieged by monsters from the moon, the group rejoins with Roan and defends the town. Soon, Valmar's Moon crashes into the Granas Cathedral, and the new Valmar emerges. Unfortunately, the group finds itself without the means to defeat him. Roan suggests traveling to the nearby Birthplace of the Gods for answers, which reveals much about the ancient war and the origins of both gods. 

Meeting another Automata named Elmo, Ryudo chooses to confront the Horns within and is beset by many trials. However, he overcomes his fears and insecurities and is granted the true Granasaber. The party challenges Valmar and enters his body. Inside, they are confronted by Zera, who attacks them before sending a false Millenia after them. Ryudo's party is victorious, and the true Millenia, now separated from Elena, joins them. Zera divides the group and launches a final attack against Ryudo, Elena, and Millenia. They defeat him and destroy Valmar for good, restoring peace to the world.

The ending shows the different characters one year after Valmar's defeat. Roan is still king and embarks on a journey to find his friends. Tio has become a nurse in Cyrum, Millenia is a teacher, and Elena tours the world as a singer in a troupe. In the last scene, Ryudo says goodbye to Granasaber and buries it under a tree in a remote area. He concludes that humanity will care for themselves and no longer depend on gods to continue living.

Characters

Playable characters 
Ryudo: The main hero of the story. Ryudo is a Geohound, a mercenary. He is skilled with a sword and shows a sharp wit. He cares little for others besides himself at first; however, his attitude changes, and he eventually wishes for a better world.
Elena: The main heroine of the story. She is a Sister of the Church of Granas and a Songstress. She joins Ryudo early on in the adventure and is typically naive about most things about the world. She wields strong healing and divine magic and uses a mace/staff as her weapon.
Millenia: A mysterious woman who meets Ryudo early on after the failed ceremony at Garmia Tower. Revealed to be the "Wings of Valmar", Millenia appears to be a rather blunt, hot-tempered woman who initially uses Ryudo to accomplish her goals but eventually falls in love with him. She uses a crossbow and absorbs pieces of Valmar to gain dark powers.
Roan: A boy that Ryudo meets in Agear town who requests help finding his lost medal. He joins Ryudo's party until it is revealed he is the prince of Cyrum kingdom, whose people served Valmar during the "Battle between Good and Evil". He eventually becomes the king, but later rejoins the party. He uses daggers/knives as his weapon.
Mareg: A beast man who initially attacks Ryudo, mistaking him for his brother, before joining him on his journey. He teaches Tio about what it means to be alive. He is strong and uses an axe/spear as his weapon.
Tio: An Automata housed under Cyrum kingdom. She is awakened by Ryudo's group and joins them, as she has no other function. She calls Mareg "Master" but eventually considers everyone a family. She uses chakrams as her weapon.

Non-playable characters 
Valmar: The God of Darkness. Destroyed, broken into pieces, and sealed after the Battle of Good and Evil. But the pieces are being released, and his revival is apparent.
Melfice: An evil swordsman whom Mareg is valiantly pursuing, he is Ryudo's brother. His strength is unholy, thanks to the Horns of Valmar within him.
His Holiness Zera: The Pope of Granas Cathedral and its leader. He sees the evil in the world and vows to defeat it at any cost. 
Selene: The High Priestess of Granas, she follows Zera's leadership without question. Her zealousness is unquestionable.
Skye: Ryudo's trusty bird companion. He's just as snarky and quick-witted as Ryudo but more mature and full of wisdom.
Granas: The God of Light. Responsible for the destruction of Valmar and the sealing of his pieces.

Ports 
Grandia II was ported to PlayStation 2 and PC after its initial release on Dreamcast. In the PlayStation 2 version, some textures and characters are less graphically detailed than in the Dreamcast version. Also, there is a tendency for graphical glitches and slow down to occur in areas with heavy graphic data. For instance, when a party member defeats the last enemy standing while using the weapon or accessory Warp effect, the character's color scheme vanishes, and only a bright white model is left.

On the PC port, there is a glitch in the first fight with Millenia. Several video files on the disc contain extra frames appearing as a freeze after casting specific spells.

On May 11, 2015, GungHo America president Jun Iwasaki revealed to GameSpot that Grandia II will be receiving an HD remaster on Steam and GOG.com. Based on the Dreamcast version of the game, the port will have a mouse, keyboard, and gamepad support. Along with the visual definition upgrade, it will include Steam achievements and Trading Cards. On August 24, 2015, Grandia II Anniversary Edition for PC was released and features visual upgrades to textures / lighting / shadows, original Japanese voice option, additional difficulty level, gamepad support, Steam Trading Cards / Steam Achievements / Steam Cloud Save support (PC only), selectable video options, remappable keyboard & gamepad support, 100 save file slots, Dreamcast VMS Save File Support.

The game received further updates for the HD Remaster edition such as enhanced details to UI / sprites / texture art, visual enhancements to original cinematic videos, widescreen support and customizable resolutions (PC only), Japanese and English audio, and new language support (original English and Japanese plus French and German translations). On October 15, 2019, Grandia II Anniversary Edition was renamed to Grandia II HD Remaster. Customers who already own the Grandia II Anniversary Edition received the upgraded version for free. Full Japanese language support along with various fixes were released on March 25, 2020.

Reception

Dreamcast version 

The original Dreamcast release of Grandia II received a largely positive response during its initial release in Japan, earning a 9.75 out of 10 rating from Dreamcast Magazine, as well as a 35 out of 40 from Weekly Famitsu, which earned it the magazine's editor's choice Platinum award. Famitsu DC rated the game 26 out of 30 based on three reviews. Despite good reception, sales of the game remained relatively low in the region, with an estimated 184,863 copies sold.

Grandia IIs English release met with an overwhelmingly positive response. It received an aggregate score of 88.81% on GameRankings and 90/100 on Metacritic. GamePro magazine found the game to be "solidly-built and features stunning visuals, dead-on controls, and a innovative combat system" yet remarked that that game's scenarios seemed too linear at times. 

On a similar note, GameSpot stated that "while the first Grandia had lengthy dungeons full of puzzles and side routes, Grandia II's dungeons are more compartmental and linear affairs", the game was ultimately "a solid RPG ... even if it isn't as deep or difficult as the original." IGN granted the game an Editor's Choice distinction, calling it a "classic" of the Dreamcast and remarking that its battle system was "arguably the most advanced system in play today", yet found the game's story and character development to be cliche and predictable. 

Eurogamer also found the game's story and gameplay to be largely methodical, and despite being dubbed "the best RPG on the Dreamcast in Europe" and  "strongly recommended", editors felt seasoned role-playing game players would find the game too generic, calling it "an incredibly tough game to call". Electronic Gaming Monthly granted the game a 9 out of 10, earning it a Gold Award.

Francesca Reyes reviewed the Dreamcast version of the game for Next Generation, rating it four stars out of five, and called the game "a winner in the RPG beauty pageant that's just clever enough in the battle department to balance out an almost too straightforward storyline."

PlayStation 2 and PC ports 

The PlayStation 2 rerelease of Grandia II in 2002 experienced lower sales than the Dreamcast version in Japan despite a higher install base, selling approximately 42,060 copies in its first month. In North America and Europe, the game received chiefly lower reviews than the original, with many publications remarking on the technical shortcomings of the port to the new console. Electronic Gaming Monthly found the PlayStation version to be vastly inferior to the original, citing reduced frame rate, color, and texture quality, adding that its "Inexplicably horrible graphics completely ruin an otherwise splendid title." 

GamePro found the conversion shortcomings to be essentially negligible, claiming that Grandia II "still holds its own as a solidly constructed but direct port in the more crowded PlayStation 2 fantasy camp" while asserting that it was still "overshadowed by Final Fantasy X." IGN still regarded the PlayStation 2 version as "a good game" and one of the top role-playing games for the system at the time but remarked that the "time and stress of transition" as well as the emergence of other prominent games during the one-year time frame had diluted the port's appeal. GameSpot called the Dreamcast release "technically superior", but the new version was recommended to those who did not play the original and that it was still "well worth playing".

Like the PlayStation 2 version, the PC release of Grandia II had a much milder response from critics than the Dreamcast version. Critiquing the game from a PC game standpoint, IGN PC stated, "This game is not like a PC RPG. It's light. It's fluffy. It's colorful. It's not exactly deep. Its storyline is console stereotypical. Its jokes are silly. Its gameplay is cartoony. And the characters all have huge eyes and no mouths." But the reviewer added that Grandia II "still manages to be fun, maybe even just because it's so different than most of the dark, dreary and serious RPGs that find their ways to our favorite platform." 

Similarly, GameSpot found that the game would be difficult for consumers accustomed to western role-playing video games to get into, remarking that "Grandia II's linear gameplay, 'young adult' sensibility, and anime artwork aren't likely to impress someone looking for another Baldur's Gate II. Still, Grandia II can be fun if you're used to Japanese RPGs to begin with or if you approach it with an open mind."

Notes

References

External links 
Official Grandia HD Collection website
Grandia II HD Remaster at GungHo America
Grandia II at MobyGames

2000 video games
Dreamcast games
Enix games
Fantasy video games
Grandia
Nintendo Switch games
PlayStation 2 games
Role-playing video games
Ubisoft games
Video games developed in Japan
Video games scored by Noriyuki Iwadare
Windows games
Game Arts games
Single-player video games
SkyBox Labs games